Mgeladze is a Georgian noble family. In Georgian it literally means "son of a wolf".

Representatives of the family were of the noble title Aznauri. Family name comes from Guria region. Individual branches were also well represented in Abkhazia and Adjara. After Georgia became a part of the Russian Empire, the family name was added to the noble book of Guria, and its representatives got equal rights as the Russian nobility.

See also
Vlasa Mgeladze, Georgian revolutionary

References

Noble families of Georgia (country)
Families of Georgia (country)
Nobility of Georgia (country)
Georgian-language surnames
Surnames of Georgian origin